Denis Colin Leary (born August 18, 1957) is an American actor and comedian. A native of Massachusetts, Leary first came to prominence as a stand-up comedian, especially through appearances on MTV (including the comedic song "Asshole") and through the stand-up specials No Cure for Cancer (1993) and Lock 'n Load (1997). Leary began taking roles in film and television starting in the 1990s, including substantial roles in the films Judgment Night (1993), Gunmen (1994), Operation Dumbo Drop (1995) and Wag the Dog (1996).

In the 2000s, he developed and starred in the television show The Job (2001–2002) and was the star and co-creator of Rescue Me (2004–2011), for which he received two Primetime Emmy nominations, one for writing and one for acting. He has continued to take starring roles in films, including Captain George Stacy in The Amazing Spider-Man and Cleveland Browns head coach Vince Penn in Draft Day. Leary has also done voice work, including Francis the ladybug in A Bug's Life and Diego the saber tooth tiger in the Ice Age franchise. 

He and his wife Ann Leary are the inspiration behind the episode of the Amazon series Modern Love "Rallying to Keep the Game Alive". From 2015 to 2016, Leary wrote and starred in the comedy series Sex & Drugs & Rock & Roll on FX.

Early life
Denis Colin Leary was born on August 18, 1957, in Worcester, Massachusetts, the son of Catholic immigrant parents from County Kerry, Ireland. His mother, Nora (née Sullivan) (b. 1929), was a maid, and his father, John Leary (1924–1985), was an auto mechanic. Leary is a citizen of both the United States and Ireland. Leary is a third cousin of talk show host Conan O'Brien.

Leary attended Saint Peter's High School (now Saint Paul's) in Worcester and graduated from Emerson College in Boston. At Emerson, he met fellow comic Mario Cantone, whom Leary considers to be his closest friend. While a student, Leary founded the Emerson Comedy Workshop, a troupe that continues on the campus today.

After graduating from Emerson in 1981, Leary taught comedy-writing classes at the school for five years. In May 2005 he received an honorary doctorate and spoke at his alma mater's undergraduate commencement ceremony; and is credited as Dr. Denis Leary on the cover of his 2009 book Why We Suck.

Career
Leary began working as a comedian at the Boston underground club Play It Again Sam's. However, his first real gig was at the Rascals Comedy Club as part of the TV show The Rascals Comedy Hour, on October 18, 1990. He wrote and appeared on a local comedy series, Lenny Clarke's Late Show, hosted by his friend Lenny Clarke and written by Martin Olson. Leary and Clarke both spoke about their early affiliations and influences in the Boston comedy scene in the documentary film When Standup Stood Out (2006). During Leary's time as a Boston-area stand-up comic, he developed his stage persona.

Leary appeared in sketches on the MTV game show Remote Control, playing characters such as Keith Richards, co-host Colin Quinn's brother and artist Andy Warhol.  He earned fame when he ranted about R.E.M. in an early 1990s MTV sketch. Several other commercials for MTV quickly followed, in which Leary would rant at high speeds about a variety of topics, playing off the then-popular and growing alternative scene. One of these rants served as an introduction to the video for "Shamrocks and Shenanigans (Boom Shalock Lock Boom)" by House of Pain. Leary released two records of his comedy: No Cure for Cancer (1993) and Lock 'n Load (1997). In late 2004, he released the EP Merry F#%$in' Christmas, which included a mix of new music, previously unreleased recordings and some tracks from Lock 'n Load. 

In 1993, Leary's sardonic song about the stereotypical American male, "Asshole", achieved much notoriety. The song was voted No. 1 in an Australian radio poll and was used in Holsten Pils ads in the UK, with Leary's participation, and with adapted lyrics criticizing a drunk driver. The single was a minor hit there, peaking at No. 58 in the UK Singles Chart in January 1996.

In 1995, Leary was asked by Boston Bruins legend Cam Neely to help orchestrate a Boston-based comedy benefit show for Neely's cancer charity; this became Comics Come Home, which Leary has hosted annually ever since.Leary has appeared in many films, including The Sandlot as Scott's stepfather Bill, Monument Ave., The Matchmaker, The Ref, Draft Day, Suicide Kings, Dawg, Wag the Dog, Demolition Man, Judgment Night, The Thomas Crown Affair and Operation Dumbo Drop. He had a role in Oliver Stone's Natural Born Killers that was eventually cut. He held the lead role in two television series, The Job and Rescue Me, and he co-created the latter, in which he played Tommy Gavin, a New York City firefighter dealing with alcoholism, family dysfunction and other issues in post-9/11 New York City.
Leary received Emmy Award nominations in 2006 and 2007 for Outstanding Lead Actor in a Drama Series for Rescue Me, and in 2008 for Outstanding Supporting Actor in a Miniseries or a Movie for the HBO movie Recount. Leary was offered the role of Dignam in The Departed (2006) but turned it down because of scheduling conflicts with Rescue Me. He provided voices for characters in animated films, such as a fire-breathing dragon named Flame in the series The Agents, a pugnacious ladybug named Francis in A Bug's Life and a prehistoric saber-toothed tiger named Diego in the Ice Age film series. He has produced numerous movies, television shows, and specials through his production company, Apostle; these include Comedy Central's Shorties Watchin' Shorties, the stand-up special Denis Leary's Merry F#$%in' Christmas and the movie Blow. 

As a Boston Red Sox fan, Leary narrated the official 2004 World Series film. In 2006, Leary and Lenny Clarke appeared on television during a Red Sox telecast and, upon realizing that Red Sox first baseman Kevin Youkilis is Jewish, delivered a criticism of Mel Gibson's antisemitic comments. As an ice hockey fan, Leary hosted the National Hockey League video NHL's Greatest Goals. In 2003, he was the subject of the Comedy Central Roast of Denis Leary.

Leary did the TV voiceover for MLB 2K8 advertisements, using his trademark rant style in baseball terms, and ads for the 2009 Ford F-150 pickup truck. He has also appeared in commercials for Hulu and DirecTV's NFL Sunday Ticket package. Leary was a producer of the Fox series Canterbury's Law, and wrote and directed its pilot episode. Canterbury's Law aired in the spring of 2008 and was canceled after eight episodes. On September 9, 2008, Leary hosted the sixth annual Fashion Rocks event, which aired on CBS. In December of the year, he appeared in a video on funnyordie.com critiquing a list of some of his "best" films, titled "Denis Leary Remembers Denis Leary Movies". Also in 2008, Leary voiced a guest role as himself in The Simpsons episode "Lost Verizon".

On March 21, 2009, Leary began the Rescue Me Comedy Tour in Atlantic City, New Jersey. The 11-date tour, featuring Rescue Me co-stars Lenny Clarke and Adam Ferrara, was Leary's first stand-up comedy tour in 12 years. The Comedy Central special Douchebags and Donuts, filmed during the tour, debuted on American television on January 16, 2011, with a DVD release on January 18, 2011.

Leary played Captain George Stacy in the movie The Amazing Spider-Man, released in July 2012. He wrote the American adaptation of Sirens. He is an executive producer of the documentary Burn, which chronicles the struggles of the Detroit Fire Department. Burn won the 2012 Tribeca Film Festival Audience Award.

Leary created a television series for FX called Sex & Drugs & Rock & Roll, taking the starring role himself. A 10-episode first season was ordered by FX, with the premiere on July 16, 2015. The show ran for two seasons.

In 2022, he was cast in the recurring role of Frank Donnelly, an NYPD officer on Law & Order: Organized Crime.

Leary has been the narrator for NESN's documentary show about the Boston Bruins called Behind the B since the show began in 2013.

Personal life

Leary has been married to author Ann Lembeck Leary since 1989. They met when he was her instructor in an English class at Emerson College. They have two children, son John Joseph "Jack" (born 1990) and daughter Devin (born 1992). Ann Leary published a memoir, An Innocent, a Broad, about the premature birth of their son on a visit to London. She has also written a novel, Outtakes From a Marriage, which was published in 2008. Her second novel, The Good House, was published in 2013. Her essay in a New York Times column about her marriage to Denis inspired the Modern Love series Episode 4: "Rallying to Keep the Game Alive".

Leary is an ice hockey fan and has a backyard rink at his home in Roxbury, Connecticut, with piping installed under the ice surface to help it stay frozen. He is a fan of the Boston Bruins and the Boston Red Sox, as well as the Green Bay Packers.

Leary describes himself as a "Jack Kennedy Democrat" with some conservative ideologies, including support for the military. Leary told Glenn Beck, "I was a life-long Democrat, but now at my age, I've come to realize that the Democrats suck, and the Republicans suck, and basically the entire system sucks. But you have to go within the system to find what you want."

Leary has said of his religious beliefs, "I'm a lapsed Catholic in the best sense of the word. You know, I was raised with Irish parents, Irish immigrant parents. My parents, you know, prayed all the time, took us to Mass. And my father would sometimes swear in Gaelic. It doesn't get more religious than that. But, no, after a while, they taught us wrong. I didn't raise my kids with the fear of God. I raised my kids with the sense of, you know, to me, Jesus was this great guy...."

Leary is godfather to Damian Hurley, the son of actress Liz Hurley.

Leary Firefighters Foundation

On December 3, 1999, six firefighters from Leary's hometown of Worcester were killed in the Worcester Cold Storage Warehouse fire. Among the dead were Leary's cousin Jerry Lucey and his close childhood friend, Lt. Tommy Spencer. In response, the comedian founded the Leary Firefighters Foundation. Since its creation in the year 2000, the foundation has distributed over $2.5 million (USD) to fire departments in the Worcester, Boston and New York City areas for equipment, training materials, new vehicles and new facilities. Leary won $125,000 for the foundation on the game show Who Wants to Be a Millionaire. He had close ties with WAAF, which in 2000 released the station album Survive This!. Part of the proceeds from this album were donated to the Leary Firefighters Foundation. 

A separate fund run by Leary's foundation, the Fund for New York's Bravest, has distributed over $2 million to the families of the 343 firemen killed in the September 11 attacks in 2001, in addition to providing funding for necessities such as a new mobile command center, first-responder training, and a high-rise simulator for the New York City Fire Department's training campus. As the foundation's president, Leary has been active in all of the fundraising. In the aftermath of Hurricane Katrina in New Orleans, Leary donated over a dozen boats to the New Orleans Fire Department to aid in rescue efforts in future disasters. The foundation also rebuilt entire NOLA firehouses.

Controversies

Plagiarism
For many years, Leary had been friends with fellow comedian Bill Hicks. But when Leary's comedy album No Cure for Cancer was released, Leary was accused of stealing Hicks' act and material, ending their friendship abruptly. In April 1993, the Austin Comedy News remarked on the similarities of Leary's performance: "Watching Leary is like seeing Hicks from two years ago. He smokes with the same mannerisms. (Hicks recently quit.) He sports the same attitude, the same clothes. He touches on almost all of the same themes. Leary even invokes Jim Fixx." When asked about this, Hicks told the magazine, "I have a scoop for you. I stole his [Leary's] act. I camouflaged it with punchlines, and to really throw people off, I did it before he did".

At least three stand-up comedians have gone on the record stating they believe Leary stole Hicks' material, comedic persona and attitude. One similar routine was about the so-called Judas Priest "suicide trial," during which Hicks says, "I don't think we lost a cancer cure."

During Leary's 2003 Comedy Central Roast, comedian Lenny Clarke, a friend of Leary's, said there was a carton of cigarettes backstage from Bill Hicks with the message, "Wish I had gotten these to you sooner." This joke was cut from the final broadcast.

The feud is also mentioned in Cynthia True's biography American Scream: The Bill Hicks Story:

According to the book, True said that upon hearing a tape of Leary's album No Cure for Cancer, "Bill was furious. All these years, aside from the occasional jibe, he had pretty much shrugged off Leary's lifting. Comedians borrowed, stole stuff and even bought bits from one another. Milton Berle and Robin Williams were famous for it. This was different. Leary had, practically line for line, taken huge chunks of Bill's act and recorded it."

In a 2008 appearance on The Opie and Anthony Show, comedian Louis C.K. claimed Leary stole his "I'm an asshole" routine, which was then expanded upon and turned into a hit song by Leary. On a later episode of the same show, Leary challenged this assertion by claiming to have co-written the song with Chris Phillips.

Autism
In his 2008 book Why We Suck: A Feel Good Guide to Staying Fat, Loud, Lazy and Stupid, Leary wrote:

Leary later stated that the quote was taken out of context and that in that paragraph he had been talking about what he calls the trend of "unwarranted" over-diagnosis of autism, which he attributed to American parents seeking an excuse for behavioral problems and under-performance. Later, he apologized to parents with autistic children whom he had offended.

Filmography

Film

Television

Video games

Discography

Albums
 No Cure for Cancer (1993)
 Lock 'n Load (1997)
 Merry F#%$in' Christmas (2004)

Singles
 "Asshole" (1993)
 "At the Rehab" (2009)
 "Douchebag" (2011)
 "Kiss My Ass" (2012)

Bibliography
 1992: No Cure for Cancer, Anchor Books 
 2007: Rescue Me: Uncensored: The Official Companion, Newmarket Press 
 2008: Why We Suck: A Feel Good Guide to Staying Fat, Loud, Lazy and Stupid, Viking 
 2010: Suck on This Year: LYFAO @ 140 Characters or Less, Viking 
 2012: Denis Leary's Merry F#%$in' Christmas, Running Press 
 2017: Why We Don't Suck: And How All of Us Need to Stop Being Such Partisan Little Bitches, Crown Archetype

Awards

References

External links

 
 
 

1957 births
Living people
20th-century American comedians
20th-century American male actors
21st-century American comedians
21st-century American male actors
American male comedians
American male film actors
American male television actors
American male voice actors
American people of Irish descent
American stand-up comedians
Comedians from Massachusetts
Emerson College alumni
Emerson College faculty
Male actors from Worcester, Massachusetts
People involved in plagiarism controversies